CorePower Yoga, based in Denver, Colorado, is the largest yoga studio chain in the United States with more than 220 locations across 22 states. In 2022, it opened seven new studios, with four new locations scheduled to open in the first quarter of 2023. The brand enrolled 170,000 new members in-studio in 2022, honing on its digital presence to continue to expand their reach.  The company was founded by Trevor Tice in 2002. CorePower Yoga offers various formats of yoga, such as their signature C2 class, Yoga Sculpt, Hot Power Fusion, and occasional bootcamp style classes. 

In April 2019, a class action lawsuit was filed against the company by more than 1,500 employees, alleging gross underpayment of wages — the fourth such lawsuit against the company.

As of January 2020, the company's new Chief Executive Officer (CEO) is Niki Leondakis.

References

External links

 

Yoga organizations
Exercise organizations
Exercise-related trademarks
2002 establishments in Colorado
Companies based in Denver